Plagiolophus is a genus of Mexican plants in the tribe Heliantheae within the family Asteraceae.

Species
The only known species is  Plagiolophus millspaughii, native to the Yucatán Peninsula in Mexico (States of Yucatán and Campeche).

References

Endemic flora of Mexico
Heliantheae